Brevimyia is a genus of flies in the family Dolichopodidae. It contains only one species, Brevimyia pulverea, and is found in New Zealand. It was originally known as Brachymyia, named by Octave Parent in 1933. Later, David Miller found the name to be preoccupied by Brachymyia (Williston, 1882), and renamed it to Brevimyia in 1945.

References 

Dolichopodidae genera
Sympycninae
Monotypic Diptera genera
Diptera of New Zealand
Taxa named by David Miller (entomologist)
Endemic insects of New Zealand